Arginase (arginine amidinase, canavanase, L-arginase, arginine transamidinase) is a manganese-containing enzyme. The reaction catalyzed by this enzyme is:
 arginine + H2O → ornithine + urea
It is the final enzyme of the urea cycle. It is ubiquitous to all domains of life.

Structure and function 
Arginase belong to the ureohydrolase family of enzymes.

Arginase catalyzes the fifth and final step in the urea cycle, a series of biochemical reactions in mammals during which the body disposes of harmful ammonia. Specifically, arginase converts L-arginine into L-ornithine and urea. Mammalian arginase is active as a trimer, but some bacterial arginases are hexameric. The enzyme requires a two-molecule metal cluster of manganese in order to maintain proper function. These Mn2+ ions coordinate with water, orienting and stabilizing the molecule and allowing water to act as a nucleophile and attack L-arginine, hydrolyzing it into ornithine and urea.

In most mammals, two isozymes of this enzyme exist; the first, Arginase I, functions in the urea cycle, and is located primarily in the cytoplasm of hepatocytes (liver cells). The second isozyme, Arginase II, has been implicated in the regulation of intracellular arginine/ornithine levels. It is located in mitochondria of several tissues in the body, with most abundance in the kidney and prostate. It may be found at lower levels in macrophages, lactating mammary glands, and brain. The second isozyme may be found in the absence of other urea cycle enzymes.

Mechanism 

The active site holds L-arginine in place via hydrogen bonding between the guanidine group with Glu227. This bonding orients L-arginine for nucleophilic attack by the metal-associated hydroxide ion at the guanidine group. This results in a tetrahedral intermediate. The manganese ions act to stabilize both the hydroxyl group in the tetrahedral intermediate, as well as the developing sp3 lone electron pair on the NH2 group as the tetrahedral intermediate is formed.

Arginase's active site is extraordinarily specific. Modifying the substrate structure and/or stereochemistry severely lowers the kinetic activity of the enzyme. This specificity occurs due to the high number of hydrogen bonds between substrate and enzyme; direct or water-facilitated hydrogen bonds exist, saturating both the four acceptor positions on the alpha carboxylate  group and all three positions on the alpha amino group. N-hydroxy-L-arginine (NOHA), an intermediate of NO biosynthesis, is a moderate inhibitor of arginase. Crystal structure of its complex with the enzyme reveals that it displaces the metal-bridging hydroxide ion and bridges the binuclear manganese cluster.

Additionally, 2(S)-amino-6-boronohexonic acid (ABH) is an L-arginine analogue that also creates a tetrahedral intermediate similar to that formed in the catalysis of the natural substrate, and is a potent inhibitor of human arginase I.

Role in sexual response 

Arginase II is coexpressed with nitric oxide (NO) synthase in smooth muscle tissue, such as the muscle in the genitals of both men and women. The contraction and relaxation of these muscles has been attributed to NO synthase, which causes rapid relaxation of smooth muscle tissue and facilitates engorgement of tissue necessary for normal sexual response. However, since NO synthase and arginase compete for the same substrate (L-arginine), over-expressed arginase can affect NO synthase activity and NO-dependent smooth muscle relaxation by depleting the substrate pool of L-arginine that would otherwise be available to NO synthase. In contrast, inhibiting arginase with ABH or other boronic acid inhibitors will maintain normal cellular levels of arginine, thus allowing for normal muscle relaxation and sexual response.

Arginase is a controlling factor in both male erectile function and female sexual arousal, and is therefore a potential target for treatment of sexual dysfunction in both sexes. Additionally, supplementing the diet with additional L-arginine will decrease the amount of competition between arginase and NO synthase by providing extra substrate for each enzyme.

Pathology 

Arginase deficiency typically refers to decreased function of arginase I, the liver isoform of arginase. This deficiency is commonly referred to as hyperargininemia or arginemia. The disorder is hereditary and autosomal recessive. It is characterized by lowered activity of arginase in hepatic cells. It is considered to be the rarest of the heritable defects in ureagenesis. Arginase deficiency, unlike other urea cycle disorders, does not entirely prevent ureagenesis. A proposed reason for the continuation of arginase function is suggested by increased activity of arginase II in the kidneys of subjects with arginase I deficiency. Researchers believe that buildup of arginine triggers increased expression of arginase II. The enzymes in the kidney will then catalyze ureagenesis, compensating somewhat for a decrease in arginase I activity in the liver. Due to this alternate method of removing excess arginine and ammonia from the bloodstream, subjects with arginase deficiency tend to have longer lifespans than those who have other urea cycle defects.

Symptoms of the disorder include neurological impairment, dementia, retardation of growth, and hyperammonemia. While some symptoms of the disease can be controlled via dietary restrictions and pharmaceutical developments, no cure or completely effective therapy currently exists.

References

External links 
 
  GeneReviews/NIH/NCBI/UW entry on Arginase Deficiency 
 Arginase family signature and profile in PROSITE

EC 3.5.3
Urea cycle